Alireza Tahmasebi (born 1961) is Iran's former Minister of Industry and Mines. He resigned on the 10 of August 2007.

He holds a Ph.D. in Mechanical Engineering from Université Laval. His master's degree was from Shiraz University.

External links
Presidential Bio

Government ministers of Iran
Shiraz University alumni
Université Laval alumni
1961 births
Living people
Islamic Revolutionary Guard Corps officers
Date of birth missing (living people)